Morris Tyler (1806 – 1876) was an American politician who was the 56th Lieutenant Governor of Connecticut from 1871 to 1873.

He was a manufacturer and wholesaler of boots and shoes.  He was active in politics as a Republican.  In 1863–65, he served as Mayor of New Haven, Connecticut.

In 1871, he won a very close and disputed election for Lieutenant Governor, with a reported 47,598 votes, versus 47,263 for incumbent Lieutenant Governor Julius Hotchkiss.

Personal life

He married Mary Frisbie Butler, and was the father of telephone industry pioneer Morris Franklin Tyler.  He died in 1876.

References

1806 births
1876 deaths
Lieutenant Governors of Connecticut
Mayors of New Haven, Connecticut
19th-century American politicians